Henry Jackson Ellicott (June 22 or 23, 1847 in Annapolis, Maryland – February 11, 1901 in Washington, D.C.) was an American sculptor and architectural sculptor, best known for his work on American Civil War monuments.

Biography
The son of James P. Ellicott and Fannie Adelaide Ince, he attended Rock Hill College School in Ellicott City, Maryland, and Gonzaga College High School in Washington, D.C. He studied at Georgetown Medical College, and may have served in the Civil War.

At age 19, he completed a larger-than-life plaster statue of Abraham Lincoln – likely an entry in the Lincoln Monument Association's competition for a marble statue – that was exhibited for two years in the United States Capitol rotunda. The competition was won by sculptor Lot Flannery, whose statue is at District of Columbia City Hall. The fate of Ellicott's Lincoln statue is unknown.

He studied at the National Academy of Design, 1867–1870, under William Henry Powell and Emanuel Leutze; and later studied under Constantino Brumidi.

His first two commissions were for monuments at Mount Calvary Cemetery in Lothian, Maryland (1870) and Greenwood Cemetery in Laurel, Maryland. He was the likely modeler of an Infantryman statue for J. W. Fiske Architectural Metals, Inc. of New York City, that was mass-produced and used in numerous municipal Civil War monuments. Company records list the sculptor's name as "Allicot."

He moved to Philadelphia, Pennsylvania, and modeled architectural sculpture on buildings for the 1876 Centennial Exposition. He remained in Philadelphia, and exhibited occasionally at the Pennsylvania Academy of the Fine Arts between 1878 and 1891.

Ellicott was appointed Superintendent and Chief Modeler for the U.S. Treasury Department in 1889, responsible for all federal monuments. He moved to Washington, D.C., where he lived until his death.

Personal
In 1883, he married Lida Dyre, of Maryland, a woman eighteen years his junior. They had no children.

Selected works

Abraham Lincoln, plaster, current whereabout unknown, ca. 1866. Exhibited in United States Capitol rotunda, 1866–1868.
Goddess of Commerce, Goddess of Protection, Goddess of Mechanism, zinc, atop New England Mutual Life Insurance Building, Boston, Massachusetts, 1875, Nathaniel Jeremiah Bradlee, architect (demolished 1946). The figure group was once the symbol of the company, but the statues were melted down in a World War II scrap-metal drive.
Recording Angel, atop Thomas P. Duncan Mausoleum, Union Dale Cemetery, Pittsburgh, Pennsylvania, 1880, Theophilus Parsons Chandler, Jr., architect.
Bas-relief portrait of John Sartain, bronze, Pennsylvania Academy of the Fine Arts, Philadelphia, Pennsylvania, ca. 1888
Architectural sculpture: 33 Keystones (Ethnological Heads), granite, Library of Congress, Washington, D.C., 1891. Carved by Ellicott and William Boyd.
Francis Elias Spinner, bronze, Myers Park, Herkimer, New York, 1894.
Zebulon Baird Vance Monument, bronze, North Carolina State Capitol, Raleigh, North Carolina, 1899–1900.

Civil War monuments
 Goddess of Victory, bronze, atop Soldiers' Monument, Veterans Park, Holyoke, Massachusetts, 1875–76.
Ellicott also modeled the four bronze relief panels on the monument's base.
 Colonel James Cameron, granite with brass sword, Civil War Monument, Cameron Park, Sunbury, Pennsylvania, 1879.
 Infantryman, bronze, Civil War Monument, Lawrence, Massachusetts, 1881. The Sailor and Cavalry Officer figures were modeled by William Rudolf O'Donovan.
 Cavalryman, bronze, 2nd Pennsylvania Cavalry Monument, Gettysburg Battlefield, Gettysburg, Pennsylvania, 1887–1889.
 Kneeling Cavalryman, bronze, 1st Pennsylvania Cavalry Monument, Gettysburg Battlefield, Gettysburg, Pennsylvania, 1889–90.
 Equestrian statue of General Winfield Scott Hancock, bronze, Washington, D.C., 1889–1896.
 Equestrian statue of General George B. McClellan, bronze, City Hall, Philadelphia, Pennsylvania, 1891–1894.

Portrait busts

 Vice-President George M. Dallas, marble, United States Senate Vice Presidential Bust Collection, United States Capitol, Washington, D.C., 1893
 Rear-Admiral George W. Melville, bronze, United States Naval Academy Museum, Annapolis, Maryland
 George Yost Coffin
 General John Schofield
 Senator Daniel W. Voorhees
 Samuel H. Kauffmann

Attributed works
Infantryman, zinc, modeled by "Allicot" (Ellicott?) and mass-produced by J. W. Fiske Architectural Metals, Inc., New York City, from ca. 1875 to 1927. Examples in Saratoga, New York (1875), Chambersburg, Pennsylvania (1878), King Ferry, New York (1882), Arcadia, Missouri (1886), Norwalk, Connecticut (1889), Oak Bluffs, Massachusetts (1890), Martha's Vineyard, Massachusetts (1891), Pottstown, Pennsylvania (1893), Berlin, New York (1906), Iola, Kansas (1909), and North Kingston, Rhode Island (1912).
Charles Evans, bronze, Charles Evans Cemetery, Reading, Pennsylvania. The undated statue is signed "ELLICOTT SC." and was cast by Bureau Brothers Foundry in Philadelphia.
Statuette of Franklin Pierce, bronzed composition metal, New Hampshire Historical Society, Concord, New Hampshire, 1896, height:  Likely Ellicott's entry in the 1896 design competition for a statue (unexecuted) for the New Hampshire State House.

References

1847 births
1901 deaths
People from Annapolis, Maryland
People from Ellicott City, Maryland
American architectural sculptors
Sculptors from Maryland
19th-century American sculptors
19th-century American male artists
American male sculptors
National Academy of Design alumni
Georgetown University School of Medicine alumni
Deaths from pneumonia in Washington, D.C.